Rajen Prasad  is a politician from New Zealand. He was elected to represent the Labour Party on the party list at the 2008 general election and retired in 2014.

Professional life
Prasad is of Indo-Fijian descent. Prasad led Massey University at Albany during its establishment in 1993 and was Race Relations Conciliator between 1996 and 2001. In the 2003 New Year Honours, Prasad was appointed a Companion of the Queen's Service Order for public services.

In June 2004 Prasad was appointed as the first Chief Commissioner of the newly established Families Commission, serving until 2008.

He joined the board of the Bank of Baroda's New Zealand office in 2008  and remained a director of the Bank until 2016.

Member of Parliament

At the 2008 election Prasad was placed at number 12 on the Labour Party list and was subsequently elected to Parliament. This was a very high list placing, far in advance of many sitting cabinet ministers. He was re-elected, albeit at a lower list placing of 30, in 2011.

In 2008, Prasad was appointed Labour's spokesperson for Voluntary and Community Sector, and associate spokesperson for Ethnic Affairs and Social Development – Family and CYF by Labour leader Phil Goff. He was later appointed spokesperson for Ethnic Affairs, as well as associate spokesperson for Social Development.

In 2013 under the new leadership of David Cunliffe, a new Labour shadow cabinet reshuffle was announced with Prasad the Spokesperson on Immigration, Associate Spokesperson for Ethnic Affairs and Associate Spokesperson for Social Development (CYFS). Prasad announced his plans to retire ahead of the general election in September 2014.

Since leaving Parliament, Prasad has been appointed a Commonwealth Envoy with special responsibility for Lesotho working directly in Africa to help develop better Political practices.

References

21st-century New Zealand politicians
Companions of the Queen's Service Order
Fijian emigrants to New Zealand
Living people
Members of the New Zealand House of Representatives
New Zealand Labour Party MPs
New Zealand list MPs
New Zealand people of Indo-Fijian descent
Year of birth missing (living people)